Smoky Valley USD 400, also known as Smoky Valley Public Schools, is a public unified school district headquartered in Lindsborg, Kansas, United States.  The district includes the communities of Lindsborg, Falun, Johnstown, Langley, Marquette, Roxbury, Salemsborg, Smolan, Venango, and nearby rural areas.

Schools
The school district operates the following schools:
 Smoky Valley High School
 Smoky Valley Middle School
 Soderstrom Elementary School

See also
 List of high schools in Kansas
 List of unified school districts in Kansas
 Kansas State Department of Education
 Kansas State High School Activities Association

References

External links
 

School districts in Kansas
Education in McPherson County, Kansas